Deepothsavam is a traditional festival celebrated by married Hindu women of the Andhra region of Andhra Pradesh, India during Deepavali.

In 2014 the festival was held at the NTR Gardens. It was organized by the Andhra government and opened by Pawan Kalyan.

Hindu festivals
Festivals in Andhra Pradesh
October observances
November observances
Religious festivals in India